The 2011 Dutch TT was the seventh round of the 2011 Grand Prix motorcycle racing season. It took place on the weekend of 23–25 June 2011 at the TT Circuit Assen.

MotoGP race report

This race was most notable for Marco Simoncelli taking out Jorge Lorenzo on the opening lap, as well as Ben Spies' first and only victory in the premier class.

Casey Stoner has a small lead over second place contender Jorge Lorenzo , the Australian having 116 and the Spaniard 98 points in the world championship title after six rounds. A bit further behind is Andrea Dovizioso in third with 83 points.

The man who grabbed pole on Saturday is Marco Simoncelli - his second and final pole position before his tragic death later that year in Malaysia - with a time of 1'34.718. American Ben Spies lines up in second place, being + 0.009 seconds slower than the Italian and world championship leader Casey Stoner in third, +0.281 seconds behind. The second row of the grid consists out of Jorge Lorenzo in fourth, Andrea Dovizioso in fifth and Cal Crutchlow in sixth. Loris Capirossi did not participare due to an injury and Dani Pedrosa was also not present due to his fractured right collarbone.

With the conditions being uncertain before the riders even took off to do their warm-up lap, confusion reigned. The race had originally been declared a wet-weather race, but as the track started to dry up more and more minutes before the start, it was declared a dry race and riders were allowed to change their tyres. During the sighting lap, Spies chose to change tyres right before the pit lane closed, putting on slicks when leader Simoncelli had full wet tyres on instead. Multiple other riders have decided to do the same, some being Crutchlow, Stoner, Lorenzo and Dovizioso, with Simoncelli eventually also opting to change. 

Eventually, all the riders take off and do their warm-up lap before lining up in their respective grid slots. As the lights go out, Simoncelli has a good start but Spies has a better one, going side-by-side heading to the Haarbocht (Turn 1) on the opening lap. However, it is Lorenzo who pips both as they go into the right-handed, losing acceleration as he puts his wheel on the still web kerb, allowing Spies to pass him and take over the lead from both at Madijk (Turn 2). Stoner behind them has dropped back to seventh after a poor start, with both Crutchlow, Colin Edwards and Dovizioso passing him for fourth, fifth and sixth place. At Madijk and Ossebroeken (Turn 3), Dovizioso passes both Edwards and Crutchlow, promoting him up to fourth position. At the narrow Strubben hairpin (Turn 5), Simoncelli has a huge moment trying to take Lorenzo's second place and highsides out of the race, taking down Lorenzo with him, promoting Dovizioso up into second and Stoner - who had passed Edwards by going down his inside at Strubben for sixth and fifth at the Veenslang, into third. This has allowed Spies to build up a small gap over the Repsol Honda duo of Dovizioso and Stoner. Further back, Valentino Rossi - who is now sixth thanks to the collision between Simoncelli and Lorenzo - is fighting for track position with Factory Ducati teammate Nicky Hayden at the Ruskenhoek (Turn 7). Both eventually manage to get their bikes restarted but are now very far behind the pack, who has almost completed the first lap by now.

On lap two, Spies has opened up a significant gap back to Dovizioso, who is now being harassed by his teammate Stoner. Further back, Rossi has managed to overtake Edwards for fifth. Stoner passes Dovizioso for second by diving down his inside at the Ossebroeken as Karel Abraham has gone down, sliding out at the entrance of the Geert Timmer Bocht (Turn 17), the Czech rider holding his arm in pain as a result. Randy de Puniet has also gone down, the Frenchman walking away unhurt and crossing the track calmly to the pits. By now, the field has stabilised.

Lap three and Spies sets the fastest lap of the race. The top six now is as follows: Spies, Stoner, Dovizioso, Crutchlow, Rossi and Hayden, who passed Edwards before the start/finish straight. The gap Spies has to Stoner is +4.048 seconds in sector two, which increases to +4.124 in sector three and +4.197 seconds at the start/finish straight.

On lap four, Dovizioso is all over the back of Stoner, shadowing him for the time being. The gap Spies has to Stoner is now +4.212 seconds at sector two, then increases to +4.287 seconds in the final sector.

Lap five and the front is still very much stable, although the Factory Ducati duo of Rossi and Hayden are being shadowed by the Monster Tech 3 Yamaha pair of Crutchlow and Edwards now. At the back, replacement rider Kousuke Akiyoshi has overtaken Héctor Barberá for eleventh place, with the Spaniard retaking the place almost immediately after. 

On lap six, Stoner now sets the fastest lap of the race. Dovizioso has now backed off, probably not being able to match Stoner's pace. By now, Lorenzo has reached the backmarkers Akiyoshi and Barberá and is battling for twelfth and eleventh place. Lorenzo easily takes thirteenth away from Akiyoshi by taking a tighter line at the Ossebroeken, then easily takes twelfth from Barberá by diving down his inside at the Strubben hairpin.

On lap seven, it is now Dovizioso who sets the fastest lap. The gap Spies has to Stoner is +3.845 seconds at the end of last lap, then it decreases to +3.830 seconds in sector one, then decreases again in sector two to just +3.747 seconds, then it decreases again to +3.651 seconds in sector three before increasing again to +3.881 seconds at the start/finish straight.

Lap eight has started and the gap Spies has to Stoner decreases in sector one to +3.662 seconds, then it decreases slightly to +6.625 seconds in sector two.

On lap nine, Stoner sets the fastest lap of the race. The gap Spies has to Stoner is still going down - it now being +3.515 seconds on the last lap. The gap decreases quite heavily in sector one to +3.234 seconds before increasing again slightly to +3.373 seconds in sector two. In sector three, the gap increases again to +3.463 seconds before increasing once more at the start/finish straight to +3.572 seconds.

Lap ten and the top six is as follows: Spies, Stoner, Dovizioso, Rossi, Crutchlow and Edwards. The gap Spies had to Stoner - which was +3.572 seconds -, has decreased to +3.406 seconds in sector one before decreasing again to +3.558 seconds in sector two. The gap decreases again very slightly in sector three to +3.555 as Spies has a slight moment exiting the Ramshoek (Turn 15). Further back, Lorenzo has caught and passed Álvaro Bautista at the straight before the entrance of De Bult (Turn 9) for tenth.

On lap eleven, the front is still stable. The gap Spies has to Stoner is +3.561 in sector two, decreasing again in sector three to +3.485 seconds and increasing slightly at the start/finish straight to +3.496 seconds.

Lap twelve and Stoner sets another fastest lap. Crutchlow enters the pits after riding a strong fourth position to retire from the race due to mechanical issues. The gap Spies has to Stoner meanwhile has decreased again to +3.307 seconds in sector one, increasing to +3.547 in sector two.

On lap thirteen - the halfway point of the race -, the front is still stable. The gap Spies has to Stoner is now +3.667 seconds in sector one, decreasing to +3.619 seconds in sector two, increasing again in sector three to +3.851 seconds. Meanwhile at the back, Lorenzo has caught and passed Toni Elías for eighth place (all riders moving up one place due to Crutchlow's retirement) by passing him at the inside of Strubben. At the start/finish straight, the gap has increased once more to +3.953 seconds.

Lap fourteen and Spies' gap to Stoner is decreasing slightly to +3.925 seconds. Lorenzo meanwhile is rapidly gaining on seventh place replacement rider Hiroshi Aoyama - the gap diminishing from 2.382 seconds at the start/finish straight to +2.128 seconds in sector one and +1.714 seconds in sector two and +1.040 seconds in sector three. Crutchlow meanwhile has decided to participate in the race again, continuing in last place. Meanwhile at the front, Spies' gap to Stoner decreases again to +3.829 seconds in sector one. Lorenzo's gap at the beginning of this lap (he is very far back to the leaders) is now only +0.521 seconds back to Aoyama's Repsol Honda as Spies' gap to Stoner increases again to +4.017 seconds in sector two. In sector three, the gap increases again very slightly to +4.018 seconds, the gap decreasing at the start/finish straight to +4.013 seconds. Lorenzo at the back has now caught Aoyama and stalks him for a couple of corners, passing him by diving down his inside at De Bult to take seventh.

On lap fifteen, the gap Spies has to Stoner decreases again to +3.969 seconds in sector one. Simoncelli further back has passed Barberá at the lap before by going up his inside at the entrance of the Geert Timmer Bocht and is now up into eleventh place.

Lap sixteen and the gap Spies has to Stoner is now +4.101 seconds in sector one. It increases to +4.400 seconds in sector two as backmarker Akiyoshi moves out of the way for Spies to get lapped, then increases again in sector three to +4.465 seconds and eventually becoming +4.579 seconds at the start/finish straight, another increase.

On lap seventeen, Spies' gap to Stoner increases again to +4.703 seconds in sector one before increasing again to +4.823 seconds in sector two. In sector three, the gap decreases to +4.657 seconds and at the start/finish line, the gap is +4.716, another increase.

Lap eighteen and the front is still stable. Spies' gap to Stoner is now over five seconds - +5.103 seconds in sector two to be precise. The American rider is now coming up to Barberá to lap him as the gap increases to +5.273 seconds in sector three and +5.272 seconds at the start/finish straight, a slight decrease.

On lap nineteen, Hayden has passed Edwards for fifth place. The gap Spies has to Stoner is now +5.493 seconds in sector one, an increase. In sector two, the gap increases again to +5.635 seconds, decreasing in sector three to +5.563 seconds. At the start/finish straight, the gap is +5.522 seconds, another decrease.

Lap twenty and no overtakes happened.

On lap twenty-one, the gap Spies has to Stoner was +5.592 seconds on the last lap. The front is still very much stable.

Lap twenty-two and Lorenzo has caught and passed Edwards, promoting him to sixth place as he easily goes down his inside at the Stekkenwal.

On lap twenty-three, Spies' gap to Stoner is now over six seconds, namely +6.108 seconds in sector one. This gap increases to +6.365 seconds in sector two as Lorenzo is now also quickly catching Hayden for fifth position, his gap diminishing from +8.133 seconds in sector one to +7.746 seconds in sector two.

Lap twenty-four and the gap Hayden has to Lorenzo continues to get smaller, from +7.746 seconds in sector two to +7.115 seconds in sector three and +6.630 seconds at the start/finish straight. The gap continues to diminish, it now being +6.108 seconds in sector one. Simoncelli has also caught and passed Bautista for tenth.

On lap twenty-five, the penultimate lap, Hayden's gap to Lorenzo is still diminishing. It now being +5.945 seconds in sector two and +5.506 in sector three. At the start/finish straight, the gap is +5.267 seconds, another decrease. At sector one, the gap decreases once more to under five seconds - +4.815 seconds to be precise, with yet another decrease at sector two to +4.555 seconds.

The final lap - lap twenty-six - has begun and Spies is still comfortably leading, followed by the Repsol Honda pair of Stoner and Dovizioso. Further back is Rossi and Hayden, with Lorenzo in sixth still hunting down Hayden. In sector three, the gap Hayden has to Lorenzo has decreased to +4.084 seconds. Spies rides a trouble-free last lap to cross the line and win the race - his first ever win in the MotoGP class - as the spectators applaud for him. Stoner pops a wheelie as he crosses the line second, with a bit further back Dovizioso coming home third. Rossi is not too far back to finish fourth, Hayden - almost being caught by Lorenzo - comes home fifth and Lorenzo in sixth place. As Lorenzo crosses the lone, he shakes his head in anger during the parade lap back to parc fermé. Simoncelli finishes ninth as he also managed to take Elías on the final lap.

During the parade lap, both Stoner and Rossi congratulate him while still on their respective bikes. Spies waves at the crowd as fellow American Hayden comes and congratulates him also, shaking his hand in the process. Lorenzo congratulates him as well, giving him a thumbs up. Stoner then does another wheelie and waves at the crowd, Dovizioso doing likewise. As Spies rides back to the pits, he waves at the crowd in jubilant fashion.

Stoner has already arrived at parc fermé, talking to his wife Adriana Tuchyna. Spies is still on his way as the Ducati crew congratulates Rossi for his excellent fourth place position on the Ducati, his brother hugging him also. Spies has now finally arrived at parc fermé, some Yamaha crewmembers congratulating a shocked and happy Spies as he steps off his bike. Simoncelli goes to his pit box as his crewmembers check his damaged bike as Spies hugs one of his own crewmen as he happily talks to them, then takes off his helmet and walks to his mother and the Yamaha Factory Racing boss to get a kiss and a handshake, being stopped to shake hands with Stoner beforehand also. Another Yamaha crewmember and his trainer both give him a hug before walking off. A happy Spies briefly poses for the camera's as the rest is still talking to the press at parc fermé, then walks off. Back at the Repsol Honda pit box, replacement rider Aoyama holds up a sign in front of the camera with the text "Dani, come back soon. Animo !!" to wish Pedrosa a speedy recovery (he would eventually come back in the race, the Italian round).

The trio goes up to the podium and Dovizioso is the first one to step on it, followed by Stoner and a delighted Spies who calmly steps on it. Arjan Bos, then TT-Assen President of the Board hands out the constructors trophy to the chief crewmember of the Factory Yamaha team, then the third place trophy to Dovizioso. Alfredo Altavilla - then CEO of Iveco - hands out the second place trophy to Stoner and Jacques Tichelaar - then the Queen's Commissioner - handed the winners' trophy to Spies, who calmly accepts it and presents it. The American national anthem plays for Spies and as it stops, the trio get the champagne handed, which they then start to spray on each other before Spies storms off the podium to spray his chief crewmember. Spies takes a sip of it as he walks back to the podium and celebrates with Stoner once more with the champagne bottles, taking another sip as well.

Spies' win does not cause any big shakeups in the world championship title, Simoncelli knocking out Lorenzo early on and Stoner finishing second does. Stoner now increases his championship lead as he has 136 points, 28 more than Lorenzo who is second with 108 points. Dovizioso is still third with 99 points. New in the top five is Hayden, who moves up into fifth place in the standings with 71 points thanks to Pedrosa's absence.

MotoGP classification

Moto2 classification

125 cc classification

Championship standings after the race (MotoGP)
Below are the standings for the top five riders and constructors after round seven has concluded.

Riders' Championship standings

Constructors' Championship standings

 Note: Only the top five positions are included for both sets of standings.

References

Dutch TT
Dutch
Tourist Trophy
Dutch TT